The men's 84 kg (184.8 lbs) Light-Contact category at the W.A.K.O. World Championships 2007 in Belgrade was the fourth heaviest of the male Light-Contact tournaments falling between the light heavyweight and cruiserweight division when compared to Low-Kick and K-1 weight classes.  There were nineteen men from three continents (Europe, Asia and Africa) taking part in the competition.  Each of the matches was three rounds of two minutes each and were fought under Light-Contact rules. 

As there were too few men for a thirty-two man tournament, thirteen of the fighters got a bye through to the second round.  The tournament winner was Murat Pukhaev from Russia who defeated the German Christian Albrecht in the final by unanimous decision to claim gold.  Defeated semi finalists Jeno Novak from Hungary and Mariusz Niziolek from Poland gained bronze medals.

Results

Key

See also
List of WAKO Amateur World Championships
List of WAKO Amateur European Championships
List of male kickboxers

References

External links
 WAKO World Association of Kickboxing Organizations Official Site

Kickboxing events at the WAKO World Championships 2007 Belgrade
2007 in kickboxing
Kickboxing in Serbia